Ian Robert Massey (born 10 September 1985) is an English cricketer.  Massey is a right-handed batsman who bowls right-arm off break.  He was born in Hereford, Herefordshire and educated at Shrewsbury School.

While studying for his degree at Queens' College, Cambridge, Massey made his first-class debut for Cambridge UCCE against Kent in 2006.  He made four further first-class appearances while at Cambridge, including two appearances for Cambridge University against Oxford University in the University Matches of 2006 and 2007.  In his five first-class matches, he scored 253 runs at an average of 28.11, with a high score of 65.  His highest score, which was his only first-class fifty, came against Oxford University in 2007.

In 2006, he made a single Minor Counties Championship appearance for Herefordshire against Cornwall.

References

External links
Ian Massey at ESPNcricinfo
Ian Massey at CricketArchive

1985 births
Living people
Sportspeople from Hereford
People educated at Shrewsbury School
Alumni of Queens' College, Cambridge
English cricketers
Cambridge University cricketers
Herefordshire cricketers
Cambridge MCCU cricketers